p73 is a protein.

P73 may also refer to:

 , a British Royal Navy submarine
 Hughes XP-73, an American fighter aircraft design
 , an Indian Navy corvette
 Papyrus 73, a biblical manuscript
 ThinkPad P73, a laptop
 P73, a state regional road in Latvia